Brightstorm’’’’is an online learning platform for teenagers. It features thousands of study videos as well as other study tools and resources such as Math Genie and College Counseling. Study videos cover math courses ranging from pre-algebra to calculus as well as English, science, and test prep for SAT, ACT, and Advanced Placement tests. The website is subscription-based and allows users to watch study videos without third-party advertisements. It is reported that Brightstorm has delivered over 20 million lessons to more than 240,000 registered users from over 200 countries.

History
Brightstorm was founded by Bumsoo Kim, Jeff Marshall, and Chris Walsh in 2008. Bumsoo Kim, then investment principal at KTB Ventures, had interests in investing in a K-12 online education company as a result of the unfulfilled potential he perceived within the industry at the time. Kim is originally from South Korea where college entrance is hyper-competitive and, thanks to the country’s early adoption of nationwide high-speed internet, has had many successful online education services. During the development stage of the business idea for Brightstorm, Kim met Marshall and Walsh through KTB and the three co-founded Brightstorm for which KTB led a Series A investment. Chris Walsh left Brightstorm in spring of 2009 and Jeff Marshall in fall of 2010.

Brightstorm’s business model has changed several times throughout the course of its existence. From the launch of its online services in 2008 until August 2009, the course model of its content was subject-oriented. In September 2009, Brightstorm launched its “free math help” section which contained more the 2,500 math videos across 6 math subjects. At this time, Brightstorm adopted a freemium business model which offered free content in math and science and paid content in test prep for SAT, ACT, and Advanced Placement tests. In July 2012, Brightstorm changed to an all-you-can-eat business model where users need a monthly subscription to watch all videos offered on the site. This subscription model is their current business model. In September 2014, Brightstorm started offering Math Genie and College Counseling to its users.

About

Flipped Classroom
Brightstorm is an advocate and example of flipped classroom teaching where students can learn on their own through online videos. Many schools across the U.S. have used Brightstorm to implement this style of teaching for their students. Another major advocate of flip teaching or blended learning is Khan Academy.

Brightstorm Format
Brightstorm offers over 3,500 study videos in over 20 subjects. This includes over 1,000 sample problems. Study videos recreate the classroom experience with real teachers in front of a whiteboard. Sample-problem videos use pencast technology to provide users with step-by-step instruction. The majority of Brightstorm teachers possess master's degrees or PhDs from widely recognized universities.

Subjects and courses covered by Brightstorm include:
 Math: pre-algebra, algebra, geometry, algebra II, trigonometry, pre-calculus, and calculus
 Science: biology, chemistry, physics
 English: grammar, writing, literature
 Test Prep: SAT, ACT, ACT Redbook, PSAT, AP US Government, AP US History, AP Biology, and AP Calculus AB

All test prep courses offer worksheets, study guides, and practice tests. SAT and ACT courses also offer diagnostic tests as well as two full-length tests. Other services provided by Brightstorm include Math Genie and College Counseling.

Math Genie provides step-by-step solutions to math problems uploaded by users. Genie covers math problems ranging from pre-algebra to calculus. Users may ask up to three math problems per month and are guaranteed to receive solutions within 48 hours.

College Counseling provides answers to academic questions commonly asked by high school students and their parents. These videos are created by a professional college admissions counselor and include topics such as How to Apply to College, How to Write a College Essay, How to Choose Extracurricular Activities, and How to Get Better Grades. Users may also upload and ask to have their own personal questions answered.

References

External links
 Brightstorm Official Website
Udacity vs Coursera Comparison

Virtual learning environments
American educational websites
Organizations established in 2008
Educational technology companies of the United States